Minarc is a design studio established by Ingjaldsdottir and Thorsteinsson in 1999. It's located in Santa Monica, California. 

The work of their practice ranges from small-scale renovations to new construction, in residential, commercial and public settings. It shares an emphasis in the blurring of the distinction between interior and exterior spaces through the exploitation of natural light, the creation of outdoor living rooms and artistically framed views of nature. Some of the materials used by them are: tiles, carpets, absence of paint, as well as an energy-conscious use of natural cross-ventilation instead of artificially forced air systems. Another hallmark of Minard designs is the innovate use of repurposed materials. such as reclaimed wood, recycled glass, rubber tires, cement panels and sustainable materials.

Awards

2010
R+D AWARD: RUBBiSH (recycled rubber sink) 

IDA International Design Award : Leone Living

2009
Europe's 40 under 40 - 2009 Laureates.

Watermark Awards
-Project of the year awards
-Grand Prize
-Special Focus - Lighting

Residential Architect Design Awards

Remodeling Design Awards

Builder's Choice Awards
-House Remodeling

2008
Builder's Choice Awards-Merit Award

The Santa Monica Sustainable Quality Award

Residential Architect Design Awards - Grand Prize: Architectural Interior

Library Hafnarfjords Competition Honorable Mention

2007
-IIDA 34th Annual Awards: Best of competition 2007
-Grand Prize: Residential

References

Architects from California
Modernist architects
Architecture firms based in California
1999 establishments in California
American companies established in 1999